Stumped is a method of dismissing a batsman in the sport of cricket.

Stumped may also refer to:

Stumped (film), a 2003 Bollywood film
Stumped (radio programme), a BBC cricket radio programme

See also
Stump (disambiguation)